Jozef Van Looy (2 March 1916 – 19 March 1958) was a Belgian footballer. He played in one match for the Belgium national football team in 1950.

References

External links
 

1916 births
1958 deaths
Belgian footballers
Belgium international footballers
Place of birth missing
Association football midfielders